The Boll Weevil Song and 11 Other Great Hits is a studio album released by Brook Benton in 1961 on Mercury LP record MG 20641 (mono) and SR 60641 (stereo). The album appeared on Billboard'''s album charts in 1961 for 13 weeks, reaching position number 70. The orchestrations were done by Stan Applebaum, who also conducted the orchestra on the sessions.

Following the significant popularity of Benton's hit "The Boll Weevil Song," Mercury quickly arranged sessions which largely rely on American Caucasian folk music for material, although Benton took composition credit for most of the songs. The result is a mix of R&B and pop. Allmusic'' reviews the album favorably, but its reviewer, Greg Adams, wishes the rest of the album had the "fire" contained in the title track.

Track listing 
All tracks composed by Brook Benton except where indicated.

References

1961 albums
Brook Benton albums
Mercury Records albums